The Pomeranian (often known as a Pom) is a breed of dog of the Spitz type that is named for the Pomerania region in north-west Poland and north-east Germany in Central Europe. Classed as a toy dog breed because of its small size, the Pomeranian is descended from larger Spitz-type dogs, specifically the German Spitz. It has been determined by the Fédération Cynologique Internationale to be part of the German Spitz breed; and in many countries, they are known as the Zwergspitz ("Dwarf Spitz").

The breed has been made popular by a number of royal owners since the 18th century. Queen Victoria owned a particularly small Pomeranian and consequently, the smaller variety became universally popular. During Queen Victoria's lifetime alone, the size of the breed decreased by half. Overall, the Pomeranian is a sturdy, healthy dog. The most common health issues are luxating patella and tracheal collapse. More rarely, the breed can have Alopecia X, a skin condition colloquially known as "black skin disease". This is a genetic disease which causes the dog's skin to turn black and lose all or most of its hair. As of 2017, in terms of registration figures, since at least 1998, the breed has ranked among the top fifty most popular breeds in the United States, and the current fashion for small dogs has increased their popularity worldwide.

Appearance 
They are compact but sturdy dogs with an abundant textured coat with a highly plumed tail set high and flat. The top coat forms a ruff of fur on the neck, which Poms are well known for, and they also have a fringe of feathery hair on the hindquarters.

The earliest examples of the breed were white or occasionally brown or black. Queen Victoria adopted a small red Pomeranian in 1888, which caused that color to become fashionable by the end of the 19th century. In modern times, the Pomeranian comes in the widest variety of colors of any dog breed, including white, black, brown, red, orange, cream, blue, sable, black and tan, brown and tan, spotted, brindle, and parti, plus combinations of those colors. The most common colors are orange, black, or cream/white.

The merle Pomeranian is a recent colour developed by breeders. It is a combination of a solid base colour with a lighter blue/grey patch which gives a mottled effect. The most common base colours for the effect are red/brown or black, although it can also appear with other colours. Combinations such as brindle merle or liver merle are not accepted in the breed standard. In addition, the eye, nose and paw pad are marshmallow color, changing parts of the eye to blue and the color on the nose and paw pads to become mottled pink and black.

Pomeranians have a thick double coat. While grooming is not difficult, breeders recommend that it be done daily to maintain the quality of the coat and because of its thickness and the constant shedding, with trimming every 1–2 months. The outer coat is long, straight, and harsh in texture while the undercoat is soft, thick and short. The coat knots and tangles easily, particularly when the undercoat is being shed, which happens twice a year.

Behavior

Pomeranians are typically friendly, lively and playful. They can be aggressive with other dogs and humans to try to prove themselves. Pomeranians are alert and aware of changes in their environment, and barking at new stimuli can develop into a habit of barking excessively in any situation. They are somewhat defensive of their territory and thus may bark when they hear outside noises. Pomeranians are intelligent, respond well to training, and can be very successful in getting what they want from their owners. They are extroverted and enjoy being the center of attention, but they can become dominant, willful and stubborn if not well trained and socialized. The use of toys can be an effective tool in training Pomeranians to spend time alone.

Health 
The life expectancy of a Pomeranian is 12 to 16 years. A well-bred dog on a good diet with appropriate exercise will have few health problems; if kept trim and fit, the Pomeranian is a sturdy dog. The breed does have similar health issues to many other dog breeds, although some issues such as hip dysplasia are uncommon because of the Pomeranian's lightweight build. Some health issues can develop as a result of lack of attention to grooming and teeth-, ear-, and eye-cleaning. With routine care, these problems can be avoided. They are prone to early tooth loss, and dry food is recommended. Poms are one of the breeds with the smallest average litter size, with various sources giving numbers of between 1.9 and 2.7 puppies per litter.

Common problems 
Merle-colored dogs may have mild to severe deafness, blindness, increased intraocular pressure, ametropia, microphthalmia, and colobomas. Merle dogs born from parents who are also both merles may additionally have abnormalities of the skeletal, cardiac and reproductive systems.

Luxating patella is another health issue in the Pomeranian breed. It occurs when, either through malformation or trauma, the ridges forming the patellar groove in the knee are not prominent and are too shallow to allow the patella to properly sit securely. This can cause the patella to "luxate" (jump out of the groove) sideways, which will cause the leg to lock up with the foot off the ground. While the muscles are contracted the patella cannot return to the correct position. The initial pain is caused by the knee cap sliding across the ridges of the femur. Once out of position, the dog does not feel any pain caused by the slipped bone.

Tracheal collapse is caused by a weakening of the tracheal rings in the windpipe. It occurs when the rings that normally hold the shape of the windpipe collapse, closing the airway. The symptoms of a collapse include a honking cough that can sound similar to a goose honk, an intolerance to exercise, fainting spells and a cough that is worsened by hot weather, exercise and excitement. The tendency for episodes of tracheal collapse typically increases in frequency and severity as the dog ages.

In Pomeranians, a condition often called "black skin disease" occurs which is a combination of alopecia (hair loss) and hyperpigmentation (a darkening of the skin). Other names for this condition include woolly coat, coat funk, pseudo-Cushing's disease, or severe hair loss syndrome. This condition affects male Pomeranians more than females, and may be inherited. Although most affected dogs show signs following puberty, it can occur at any age. Other conditions can mimic this condition including Cushing's syndrome, hypothyroidism, chronic skin infections, and reproductive hormone disorders.

Another common disorder in male Pomeranians is cryptorchidism. This is when either one or both of the testicles do not descend into the scrotum. It is treated through surgical removal of the retained testicle.

Exercise 
The Pomeranian is a small but energetic breed of dog. Although Pomeranians benefit from frequent attention, they need relatively little exercise: it is recommended to take them on several daily walks and let them run around an enclosed space.

History

Origins 

The Pomeranian is considered to be descended from the German Spitz. The breed is thought to have acquired its name by association with the area known as Pomerania which is located in northern Poland and Germany along the Baltic Sea. Although not the origin of the breed, this area is credited with the breeding which led to the original Pomeranian type of dog. Proper documentation was lacking until the breed's introduction into the United Kingdom.

An early modern recorded reference to the Pomeranian breed is from 2 November 1764, in a diary entry in James Boswell's Boswell on the Grand Tour: Germany and Switzerland. "The Frenchman had a Pomeranian dog named Pomer whom he was mighty fond of." The offspring of a Pomeranian and a wolf bred by an animal merchant from London is discussed in Thomas Pennant's A Tour in Scotland from 1769.

Two members of the British Royal Family influenced the evolution of the breed. In 1767, Queen Charlotte, Queen-consort of King George III of Great Britain, brought two Pomeranians to England.

Named Phoebe and Mercury, the dogs were depicted in paintings by Sir Thomas Gainsborough.

Queen Victoria, Queen Charlotte's granddaughter, was also an enthusiast and established a large breeding kennel. One of her favoured dogs was a comparatively small red sable Pomeranian which she possibly named "Windsor's Marco" and was reported to weigh only . When she first exhibited Marco in 1891, it caused the smaller-type Pomeranian to become immediately popular and breeders began selecting only the smaller specimens for breeding. During her lifetime, the size of the Pomeranian breed was reported to have decreased by 50%. Queen Victoria worked to improve and promote the Pomeranian breed by importing smaller Pomeranians of different colours from various European countries to add to her breeding program. Royal owners during this period also included Joséphine de Beauharnais, the wife of Napoleon I of France, and King George IV of the United Kingdom.

The first breed club was set up in England in 1891, and the first breed standard was written shortly afterwards. The first member of the breed was registered in the United States to the American Kennel Club in 1898, and it was recognized in 1900.

In 1912, two Pomeranians were among only three dogs to survive the sinking of RMS Titanic. A Pomeranian called "Lady", owned by Miss Margaret Hays, escaped with her owner in lifeboat number seven, while Elizabeth Barrett Rothschild took her pet to safety with her in lifeboat number six.

Glen Rose Flashaway won the Toy Group at the Westminster Kennel Club Dog Show in 1926, the first Pomeranian to win a group at Westminster. It would take until 1988 for the first Pomeranian, "Great Elms Prince Charming II", to win the Best in Show prize from the Westminster Kennel Club.

In the standard published in 1998, the Pomeranian is included in the German Spitz standard, along with the Keeshond, by the Fédération Cynologique Internationale. According to the standard "Spitz breeds are captivating" and have a "unique characteristic, cheeky appearance."

Popularity 
The Pomeranian has been among the more popular dog breeds in the United States, featuring consistently in the top 20 of registered American Kennel Club dog breeds since at least 1998, when it was ranked #10; the breed was #17 in the 2011 rankings, dropping two spots from the previous year. In 2012 and 2013 it remained in the top twenty and was ranked at #19. In 2015, the breed fell to #21, falling further to #22 in both 2016 and 2017. 

It is not listed in the top 20 breeds in the UK in either 2007 or 2008. In Australia their popularity has declined since 1986, with a peak of 1,128 Pomeranians registered with the Australian National Kennel Council in 1987; only 577 were registered in 2008. However, this is an increase from 2004, when only 491 dogs were registered. It is recognised that the common Pomeranian is listed as the 27th most intelligent dog with the German Shepherd sitting at no 1. 

It is more popular in American cities in 2008, ranking joint tenth (with the American Bulldog) in Detroit and Orlando, ninth in Los Angeles, a joint seventh in Seattle (again, with the American Bulldog), but third in Honolulu, only bested by the Labrador Retriever and the German Shepherd.

See also 

 Companion dog
 Boo (dog)
 Lap dog
 Missile (Ghost Trick)
 Therapy dog

References

Further reading

External links 

 

FCI breeds
Companion dogs
Dog breeds originating in Germany
Dog breeds originating in Prussia
Pomerania
Spitz breeds